Agathotanaidae is a family of crustaceans belonging to the order Tanaidacea.

Genera:
 Agathotanais Hansen, 1913 
 Allodaposia Sieg, 1986 
 Bunburia Jóźwiak & Jakiel, 2012 
 Metagathotanais Bird & Holdich, 1988 
 Ozagathus Błażewicz-Paszkowycz & Bamber, 2012 
 Paragathotanais Lang, 1971 
 Paranarthrura Hansen, 1913

References

Tanaidacea
Crustacean families